Engina mundula is a species of sea snail, a marine gastropod mollusk in the family Pisaniidae.

This is a species inquirenda.

Description

Distribution

References

Pisaniidae